Cheryl Reeve (born September 20, 1966) is an American basketball head coach and President of Basketball Operations for the Minnesota Lynx of the WNBA. Reeve has coached the Lynx to four league championships. In WNBA history, she has the highest winning percentage, she has won the most games of any female coach, and she has won the most postseason games of any coach. Reeve was named the WNBA Coach of the Year in 2011, 2016, and 2020 and WNBA Basketball Executive of the Year in 2019.

Early life and education
Reeve grew up in Washington Township, Gloucester County, New Jersey and graduated from Washington Township High School in 1984, where she was part of the school's first team to make the state finals. In 1988, Reeve was a Rhodes Scholar nominee and received a MAAC Scholar-Athlete Post Graduate Award and an NCAA Post-Graduate Scholarship. She earned a bachelor's degree in computer science that year and then an MBA, both from La Salle University.

Coaching career
Reeve started out as assistant coach at her alma mater, La Salle for two years. She was then an assistant at George Washington for five years. The Colonials posted five 20-win seasons, captured three Atlantic 10 Conference Championships and appeared in four NCAA tournaments during Reeve's stint at George Washington. Her first head coaching position was with the Indiana State Sycamores from 1995 to December 1 of the 2000–2001 season (replaced by her assistant coach Jim Wiedie). She improved the team's record each year for the first four seasons, and led the squad to its first postseason berth in 20 years following the 1998-1999 campaign. She's currently tied with Kay Riek for 5th in Wins among Lady Sycamore annals

Reeve got her start in the WNBA with the Charlotte Sting in 2001 when she joined Anne Donovan’s staff as an assistant. After posting an 8-24 record the year previous, Charlotte turned things around in Reeve’s first year by going 18-14 and advancing to the WNBA Finals. They followed in 2002, with another 18-14 mark and their second straight appearance in the postseason.

Following the 2002 campaign, Donovan left to become the head coach of the Seattle Storm, and Dan Hughes and the Cleveland Rockers hired Reeve away from Charlotte. The Rockers advanced to the playoffs that year, but in the offseason ownership decided to cease operation of the team making Reeve a coaching free agent. She rejoined the Sting staff for the 2004 and 2005 seasons. Reeve then spent four seasons as an assistant coach with the Detroit Shock, also serving as the team's last general manager before they moved to Tulsa.

In the last two Olympics, the 2016 games in Rio de Janeiro and 2020 in Tokyo, Reeve has served as an assistant coach on Team USA. In 2016, Geno Auriemma was the head coach, while Staley took over for the 2020 competition.

Before taking on her role among the assistant coaching staff, Reeve had served as an assistant for the 2014-16 USA National Team that took home gold medals at the 2014 FIBA World Cup Team and 2016 Olympic Games. She returned as an assistant for the 2018 World Cup Team, winning gold and qualifying the USA for the 2020 Olympics.

Minnesota Lynx

Reeve was named the head coach of the Minnesota Lynx on December 8, 2009. In her first season, the Lynx went 13-21, missing the playoffs. The team was hampered by injuries to Candice Wiggins and Seimone Augustus. At one point, a frustrated Reeve said bluntly, "We are a bad basketball team. It starts at the top. I have not been able to get them to understand defensively what we need to get done and, clearly, our offense is one of the worst in the league."

The Lynx improved dramatically in 2011. With Wiggins and Augustus back healthy, and with the addition of rookie Maya Moore, the team got off to a quick start and did not falter throughout the regular season, finishing with a league-best 27–7 record. The dramatic turnaround earned Reeve the WNBA Coach of the Year Award in just her second year as a head coach at the professional level. The Lynx finished what they started, losing only one game in the playoffs en route to their first WNBA championship.

Reeve took her team back to the playoffs in her third year. The team qualified for the playoffs after just 21 games, the fastest in franchise history. Reeve became the winningest coach in Lynx franchise history on August 26, 2012, with a win over the Atlanta Dream. The Lynx went on to lose to the Indiana Fever in the WNBA Finals.

In 2013, Reeve and her staff coached the WNBA Western Conference All-Star Team, as the Lynx had won the conference championship the previous year. Reeve's squad included four Lynx players -- Seimone Augustus, Maya Moore, Rebekkah Brunson, and Lindsay Whalen. Reeve's team ended up winning the game, 102–98. Reeve's team then swept through the playoffs, going 7-0 en route to their second championship under her leadership.

Reeve is currently the winningest coach in franchise history, both in terms of the number of won games and winning percentage, and by percentage the winningest coach in WNBA history. She won her 100th regular season game on June 2, 2014, in a victory over the San Antonio Stars. She won her 31st postseason game on September 30, 2016, in a semi-final victory over the Phoenix Mercury, to move into first place in WNBA history in playoff wins.

Reeve was named the WNBA coach of the year by a panel of media representatives in 2016.

In December 2017, Reeve was also promoted to the Lynx General Manager position.

Reeve was named the AP coach of the year in 2020, as well as the WNBA Coach of the Year.

Personal life
Reeve is married to singer and Lynx vice president Carley Knox. They have one child, Oliver, who Knox said has seen every Lynx home game since he was born.

Coaching record

Indiana State

Minnesota Lynx

|-
| align="left" | MIN
| align="left" |2010
|34||13||21||.382|| align="center" |5th in West||—||—||—||
| align="center" |Missed Playoffs
|- ! style="background:#FDE910;"
| align="left" | MIN
| align="left" |2011
|34||27||7||.794|| align="center" |1st in West||8||7||1||.875
| align="center" |Won WNBA Finals
|-
| align="left" | MIN
| align="left" |2012
| 34|| 27|| 7||.794|| align="center" |1st in West||9||5||4||.555
| align="center" |Lost WNBA Finals
|- ! style="background:#FDE910;"
| align="left" | MIN
| align="left" |2013
| 34 || 26|| 8||.765|| align="center" |1st in West||7 ||7 ||0 ||1.000
| align="center" |Won WNBA Finals
|-
| align="left" | MIN
| align="left" |2014
| 34 || 25|| 9||.735|| align="center" |2nd in West||5 ||3 ||2 ||.600
| align="center" |Lost in Western Conference Finals
|- ! style="background:#FDE910;"
| align="left" | MIN
| align="left" |2015
| 34 || 22|| 12||.647|| align="center" |1st in West||10 ||7 ||3 ||.700
| align="center" |Won WNBA Finals
|-
| align="left" | MIN
| align="left" |2016
| 34 || 28|| 6||.824|| align="center" |1st in West||8 ||5 ||3 ||
| align="center" | Lost in WNBA Finals 
|- ! style="background:#FDE910;"
| align="left" | MIN
| align="left" |2017
| 34 || 27|| 7||.794|| align="center" |1st in West||8 ||6 ||2 ||.700
| align="center" |Won WNBA Finals
|-
| align="left" | MIN
| align="left" |2018
| 34 || 18|| 16||.529|| align="center" |4th in West||1 ||0 ||1 ||.000
| align="center" |Lost in 1st Round
|-
| align="left" | MIN
| align="left" |2019
| 34 || 18|| 16||.529|| align="center" |4th in West||0 ||0 ||1 ||.000
| align="center" |Lost in 1st Round
|-
| align="left" | MIN
| align="left" |2020
| 22 || 14 || 8 |||| align="center" |4th in West|| 4 || 1 || 3 || 
| align="center" |Lost in Semifinals
|-
| align="left" | MIN
| align="left" | 2021
| 32 || 22 || 10 ||  || align="center" | 2nd in West || 1 || 0 || 1 || 
| align="center" |Lost in Second Round
|-
| align="left" | MIN
| align="left" |2022
|36||14||22|||| align="center" |5th in West||—||—||—||
| align="center" |Missed Playoffs
|-class="sortbottom"
| align="left" |Career
| ||430||281||149|||| ||61||41||21||

References

External links

 WNBA profile

1966 births
Living people
American women's basketball coaches
Basketball coaches from New Jersey
Basketball players from New Jersey
Charlotte Sting coaches
Cleveland Rockers coaches
Detroit Shock coaches
Lesbian sportswomen
LGBT basketball players
LGBT people from New Jersey
American LGBT sportspeople
Minnesota Lynx head coaches
Place of birth missing (living people)
Indiana State Sycamores women's basketball coaches
La Salle Explorers women's basketball players
People from Washington Township, Gloucester County, New Jersey
Sportspeople from Gloucester County, New Jersey
Washington Township High School (New Jersey) alumni
Women's National Basketball Association championship-winning head coaches
Women's National Basketball Association general managers
21st-century LGBT people